Yogendra Sharma (20 August 1915 – 15 March 1990) was an Indian politician. He was a Member of Parliament, representing Bihar in the Rajya Sabha the upper house of India's Parliament. He also represented Begusarai Lok Sabha Constituency in the Lok Sabha, the lower house of Indian Parliament. He also led the Kisan Movement as the head of the All India Kisan Sabha as a member of the Communist Party of India.

References

External links
Official biographical sketch on the Parliament of India website

Rajya Sabha members from Bihar
Communist Party of India politicians from Bihar
1915 births
1990 deaths
India MPs 1967–1970
Lok Sabha members from Bihar